Sherburn railway station may refer to:
 Sherburn Colliery railway station in County Durham, England, originally opened as Sherburn
 Sherburn House railway station in County Durham, England, originally opened as Sherburn
 Sherburn-in-Elmet railway station in North Yorkshire, England
 Weaverthorpe railway station in North Yorkshire, England, originally opened as Sherburn